Pascal Barré (born 12 April 1959 in Houilles, Yvelines) is a former track and field athlete from France who competed mainly in the 100/200 metres.

Athletic career
He was a bronze medalist in the European Junior championships in 1977.  He was French 200 metre champion on 3 occasions, and twice indoor 200 metre champion. He also won the indoor 400 metre French title.

He reached the semifinal of the 200 metres at the European championships in Stuttgart in 1986.

He competed for France in the 1980 Summer Olympics held in Moscow, Soviet Union. He did not run the 200 metres as he was scheduled, but in the 4 x 100 metre relay, where he won the bronze medal with his team mates Antoine Richard, Patrick Barré (his twin brother) and Hermann Panzo.

References
sports-reference

1959 births
Living people
People from Houilles
French male sprinters
Olympic bronze medalists for France
Athletes (track and field) at the 1980 Summer Olympics
Olympic athletes of France
French twins
Twin sportspeople
Medalists at the 1980 Summer Olympics
Olympic bronze medalists in athletics (track and field)
Universiade medalists in athletics (track and field)
Sportspeople from Yvelines
Universiade bronze medalists for France
Medalists at the 1979 Summer Universiade
20th-century French people
21st-century French people